Vlasta Foltová (March 14, 1913 – May 2, 2001) was a Czechoslovak gymnast who competed in the 1936 Summer Olympics.

In 1936 she won the silver medal as member of the Czechoslovak gymnastics team. She was the last surviving member of the that team when she died in 2001.

References 

 Vlasta Foltová's profile at databaseOlympics.com
 Vlasta Foltová's profile at Sports Reference.com

1913 births
2001 deaths
Czechoslovak female artistic gymnasts
Olympic gymnasts of Czechoslovakia
Gymnasts at the 1936 Summer Olympics
Olympic silver medalists for Czechoslovakia
Olympic medalists in gymnastics
Gymnasts from Prague
Medalists at the 1936 Summer Olympics